Sharon Gaber (born 1964) is the chancellor of the University of North Carolina at Charlotte. Prior to that, she served as the first female president of the University of Toledo, selected to the post on March 12, 2015. Before serving as president of The University of Toledo, she was the provost and the Vice-Chancellor of Academic Affairs at the University of Arkansas from May 1, 2009, to 2015.

On April 28, 2020, Gaber was announced as the fifth chancellor of the University of North Carolina at Charlotte. She entered office as the 5th chancellor of UNC Charlotte on July 20, 2020, and became the first woman to serve in that position. The founder, Bonnie Cone, was in a similar position before the Chancellor position was established.

Personal life
Gaber was born in Pasadena, California in 1964, and she graduated from the Occidental College with Bachelor of Art (BA) degrees in Economics and Urban Studies; from the University of Southern California with a Master's in Planning, and from Cornell University, with a Ph.D. in City & Regional Planning. Her research interests are in planning methods and community needs assessment of marginalized populations.

She was a faculty member at the University of Nebraska-Lincoln. She served as Department Chair, and held the A. Leicester Hyde endowed professorship.

Gaber served as a professor of sociology at Auburn University, and as Associate Dean of the Auburn University College of Architecture, Design, and Construction.
She was senior associate provost and associate provost for academic administration. She was also the interim provost.

Works
"Qualitative Assessment of Transit Needs: The Nebraska Case" J. Urban Plann. Dev. 125, 59 (1999)

References

External links
"SL Gaber", google scholar

Living people
University of Arkansas faculty
1964 births
Cornell University College of Architecture, Art, and Planning alumni
USC Sol Price School of Public Policy alumni
Occidental College alumni
Presidents of the University of Toledo